Chi-Tang Ho (born 1944) is a Chinese-born American food scientist. He received his PhD in organic chemistry in 1974 and started working as a researcher and professor in the food science department at Rutgers University. He is now director of the food science graduate program at Rutgers University in New Brunswick, New Jersey.

Accomplishments
Ho has written over 400 journal articles and 140 book chapters on different topics related to science and nutrition. Additionally he has edited 30 scientific books and received seven U.S. patents related to nutrition. He has been an associate editor for the Journal of Food Science, and served on the editorial boards of many food and nutrition journals. He is currently the senior editor at Molecular Nutrition and Food Research. Since 2000, Ho has been an honorary professor at universities in China.--currently, at the Southern Yangtze University in Wuxi, China.

Education and professional experience
BS, Chemistry, National Taiwan University; 
MA, Organic Chemistry, Washington University in St. Louis;  
PhD, Organic Chemistry, Washington University in St. Louis

Awards
 Fellow, The American Chemical Society (2010)
 Elected Fellow, The International Academy of Food Science and Technology (2006)
 ACS Award for the Advancement of Application of Agricultural and Food Chemistry: American Chemical Society (2005)
Institute of Food Technologists (IFT) Stephen S. Chang Award for Lipid or Flavor Science (2002)
IFT Fellow (2003)
Board of Trustees Award for Excellence in Research at Rutgers, The State University of New Jersey: Rutgers University
Cited as “Highly Cited Researcher” in Agricultural Sciences: Institute for Scientific Information
Spotlight Award for Research Excellence: Cook College, Rutgers University
Fellow Award:  Agricultural and Food Chemistry Division, American Chemical Society (ACS)
American Chemical Society Newsmaker for Research in an ACS Journal Award
Distinguished Service Award:  Agricultural and Food Chemistry Division, American Chemical Society
Platinum Award:  Agricultural and Food Chemistry Division, American Chemical Society, 1994 & 1995

References

Institute of Food Technologists Past Award Winners
List of IFT Fellows
Rutgers University profile

American food chemists
American food scientists
Chinese food scientists
Fellows of the Institute of Food Technologists
National Taiwan University alumni
Rutgers University faculty
Washington University in St. Louis alumni
1944 births
Living people
Fellows of the American Chemical Society